Barbados competed at the 2022 World Aquatics Championships in Budapest, Hungary from 18 June to 3 July.

Swimming

Barbadian swimmers have achieved qualifying standards in the following events.

References

Nations at the 2022 World Aquatics Championships
2017
World Aquatics Championships